The following lists events that happened during 1957 in the Grand Duchy of Luxembourg.

Incumbents

Events

 16 March – Representing Luxembourg, Danièle Dupré finishes fourth in the Eurovision Song Contest 1958 with the song Amours mortes (tant de peine).
 25 March – Luxembourg is one of the six founder signatories of the Treaty of Rome, creating the European Economic Community.
 29 July – Health insurance is made mandatory for all employees.
 31 December – The new title of 'Secretary of State' is created for junior members of the government.

Births
 1 February – Jean-Marie Halsdorf, politician
 9 February – Camille Kerger, musician
 15 May – Prince Jean of Luxembourg
 15 May – Princess Margaretha of Liechtenstein
 29 May – Yvette Gastauer-Claire, sculptor
 9 July – Roland Bombardella, soldier and athlete
 13 July – Eugène Urbany, cyclist

Deaths

Footnotes

References